The PSAT Sports Awards (Greek: Αθλητικά Βραβεία ΠΣΑΤ) are the annual sports awards that are issued by the Panhellenic Sports Press Association (PSAT). The awards are given to the year's top performing individual athletes, in the form of Athlete of the Year awards, and also to the year's top performing sports teams in the nation of Greece. The award winners are chosen by the votes of a panel of sports editors in Greece.

The first PSAT Sports Awards were given in the year 1954, by the sports writers of the "Sports Press Association" (SAT), which was later renamed to the "Panhellenic Association of Sports Writers (PSAT)". The awards ceremony, which takes place every year in front of a large audience, is also often honored by the presence of the current President of the Hellenic Republic, at the time of the event. The PSAT Sports Awards are considered to be the most important annual sports award that any Greek athlete is given by their own country.

From 1954 to 1973, the award was for individual Greek athletes, regardless of their gender. However, in 1960, the crew of the sailing vessel "Nireus", was given the award, due to their gold medal win at the 1960 Rome Summer Olympics. Since 1964, separate awards are also given to Greek sports teams. Since 1974, separate individual awards are given out to both male and female athletes of Greece. In 2004, awards categories for coaches and athletes with disabilities were added. Separate categories for male and female athletes with disabilities were added in 2008. A category for the best sports team with disabilities was added in 2013.

There are also the following awards: The Athletics Contribution and Ethics award, which is given to Greek athletes that have made a great long-term contribution to Greek sports. The Fair-Play award, which is given to Greek athletes that have displayed good character, by consistently honoring and observing the rules of fair-play in their respective sports. The Rising Talent award, which is given to young Greek athletes that are considered to be possible future stars in their respective sports. And the Social Contribution award, which is given to contributors that have helped to promote the growth of Greek sports. There are also honorary distinctions that are given to sports club personalities that have made significant contributions to Greek sports, as well.

Best Greek Athlete (1954–1973)
From 1954 to 1973, The Best Greek Athlete, or Greek Athlete of the Year award was given to single individuals, regardless of their gender. However, the award was won only by males. In 1960, instead of giving the award to a single individual athlete, the crew of the sailing vessel "Nireus", was awarded as a team. That was in honor of their gold medal win at the 1960 Rome Summer Olympics.

In 1970, Christos Papanikolaou broke the world record in the men's pole vault. In honor of that achievement, he was given the award, without a vote being held to determine the year's winner of the award. In 1972, rather giving the award to a single individual athlete, three winners were chosen. In honor of their good performances at the 1972 Munich Summer Olympics.

Best Greek Male Athlete (1974–present)
In 1974, separate individual awards for both male and female athletes were established, with the Best Greek Male Athlete, or Greek Male Athlete of the Year award beginning in that year. In 1996, rather than giving the award to a single individual athlete, the award was given to all of the 1996 Atlanta Summer Olympics gold medalists, without a vote. In 2000, an individual award was given to Kostas Kenteris. However, at the same time, Club Association Society awards were also given to Pyrros Dimas, Akakios "Kachi" Kakiasvilis, and Michalis Mouroutsos, in honor of their gold medal performances at the 2000 Sydney Summer Olympics.

Best Greek Female Athlete (1974–present)
In 1974, separate individual awards for both male and female athletes were established, with the Best Greek Female Athlete, or Greek Female Athlete of the Year award beginning in that year. In 1982, rather than giving the award to an individual athlete, Sofia Sakorafa and Anna Verouli were given the award, without a vote being held. That was done in order to honor their achievements in that year. In that year, Sakorafa broke the world record in the javelin throw, and Anna Verouli won the gold medal at the 1982 European Athletics Championships.

Best Greek Sports Team (1964–present)
The award for the Best Greek Sports Team was established in 1964.

Best Sports Coach in Greece (2004–present)
The award for the Best Greek Sports Coach began in 2004. The award is given to the best sports coach of any Greek team, regardless of whether they are of Greek or foreign nationality, or to the best sports coach with Greek nationality, regardless of where they coach.

Best Greek athlete with a disability (2004–2007)
From 2004 to 2007, there was a single award for both Greek male and female athletes with disabilities. In 2007, Anthi Karagianni became the only female to win the Best Greek Athlete with a disability award.

Best Greek male athlete with a disability (2008–present)
The award for the best Greek male athlete with a disability, began in the year 2008.

Best Greek female athlete with a disability (2008–present)
The award for the best Greek female athlete with a disability, began in the year 2008.

Best Greek disabled athlete's team (2013–present)
The award for the Best Greek disabled athlete's team began in the year 2013.

1980 Greek Football Super Cup
In 1980, the Panhellenic Sports Press Association (PSAT) also established the Greek Football Super Cup. The teams that contested the original Greek Football Super Cup event were Olympiacos Piraeus and Kastoria. The game was won by Olympiacos, by a score of 4–3.

References

Sources
"The best of 25 years" (tribute to the institution), magazine "Maties sta Spor", January 1988.

External links
PSAT official website 
PSAT Awards articles 

1954 establishments in Greece
Awards established in 1954
Greece sport-related lists
Greek awards
Lists of award winners
Lists of sportspeople
Greece
Sport in Greece